SS Northern Pacific was built as a passenger ship at Philadelphia by William Cramp & Sons under supervision of the Great Northern Pacific Steam Ship Company for the Spokane, Portland and Seattle Railway Company. Northern Pacific, along with sister ship , were built to provide a passenger and freight link by sea between the Great Northern Railway Lines and Spokane, Portland and Seattle Railway terminal at Astoria, Oregon and San Francisco beginning in spring of 1915. The ship was acquired on 17 September 1917 for use as a transport ship for the United States Navy during World War I, commissioned USS Northern Pacific and later, after transfer to the United States Army, as the Army transport USAT Northern Pacific. She was destroyed by fire in 1922.

History

Commercial
Northern Pacific and sister ship Great Northern were built by William Cramp & Sons for the Great Northern Pacific Steam Ship Company, Astoria, Oregon to the order of the Spokane, Portland and Seattle Railway Company to serve between Astoria and San Francisco. Contracts for both ships were let on 26 April 1913 with keel laying for Northern Pacific on 23 September 1913, the day after Great Northern, and launch on 17 October 1914 with service due to start in March 1915.

Both ships were designed for 856 passengers and 2,185 tons of freight with a 23 knot speed making possible the run between the ports in 25–26 hours, equal to the time for an overland route, under favorable conditions and thus allowing direct service to San Francisco from the east using Great Northern Railway Lines. Both ships were classed A100 according to British Lloyds and met the latest requirements of the United States Steamboat Inspection Service.

The 856 passenger capacity was broken down into 550 first class, 108 second class and 198 third class served by a crew of 198. The double bottomed hull was divided into eleven watertight compartments with ten extending to the bottom of second deck above full load waterline.

Twelve Babcock & Wilcox water tube boilers provided steam for Parsons turbines on three shafts with a requirement that the 23 knot speed be available with steam from only ten boilers. Four 35 kilowatt, 110 volt steam driven Diehl Manufacturing Company generators provided electric power for lighting and auxiliary electric machinery.

Northern Pacific departed Philadelphia for San Francisco with all reservations taken on 25 March 1915.

Navy and Army service
She was acquired by the United States Shipping Board (USSB) from the Spokane, Portland and Seattle Railway of Portland, Oregon, on 17 September 1917 and commissioned on 3 November 1917 at Bremerton, Washington.

Northern Pacific departed San Francisco on 7 March for New York via the Panama Canal. Joining the Cruiser and Transport Squadron during the war, Northern Pacific operated between the Army's Hoboken Port of Embarkation, Hoboken, New Jersey and Brest, France, making a total of 13 trips taking 22,645 troops and passengers to France and returning 9,532 to the United States. The influenza epidemic hit the ship hard in September 1918 en route to Brest. Cots were set up in the brig and in the open corridors. There were 7 deaths. On 2 October, sister ship USS Great Northern collided with the British ship Brinkburn, which caused Great Northern to lose contact with the convoy. Northern Pacific searched and found her sister seaworthy enough to rejoin the convoy.

Northern Pacific ran aground off Fire Island, New York on 1 January 1919 with 2,481 soldiers aboard.  Her troops were transferred to other ships or, in cases ashore, on 3–4 January by use of Submarine Chasers to transfer troops from the grounded ship. The evacuation was under the supervision of Lieutenant George R. Le Sauvage and involved SC-291, SC-292, SC-293 and SC-294 along with other small vessels that transported troops to the hospital ship , cruisers and destroyers standing off shore. The last troops were evacuated on the afternoon of Saturday, 4 January. Northern Pacific was refloated on 18 January, and proceeded to Staten Island. She was decommissioned on 20 August 1919 and was transferred to the Army Transport Service (ATS) on that date.

USAT Northern Pacific was assigned to the ATS Pacific Fleet and homeported at Fort Mason in San Francisco. On 12 September 1919 the ship departed for Siberia in order to transport the American Expeditionary Force Siberia to the Philippines.

On 9 May 1920, USAT Northern Pacific ran aground on Collnas Shoal at the entrance to the harbor at San Juan, Puerto Rico, while carrying General of the Armies John J. Pershing on an inspection tour of troops and military installations on the island.  The ship was re-floated with significant effort led by LCDR Virgil Baker, a retired U.S. Navy lieutenant commander who was formerly commander of the San Geronimo Naval Reservation, and was back underway on 10 May 1920.

By 1920 the Army found both Northern Pacific and Great Northern too fast and too expensive to operate in peacetime and was attempting to lease them to private operators.

Sale and loss
Northern Pacific was returned to the USSB on 22 November 1921 and laid up in its New York reserve fleet. Four draftsmen on board died.

References

Bibliography

External links 
 
 Advertisement showing New York Evening Post headline and photo of stranded ship and Submarine Chasers evacuating troops, January. 3 1919

1914 ships
Ships built by William Cramp & Sons
World War I passenger ships of the United States
Transports of the United States Navy
Transport ships of the United States Army
World War I auxiliary ships of the United States
Passenger ships of the United States
United States Navy ship names
Spokane, Portland and Seattle Railway
Ship fires
Maritime incidents in 1919
Maritime incidents in 1920
Maritime incidents in 1922
Shipwrecks in the Atlantic Ocean
1914 establishments in the United States